King Si may refer to:

King Si of Zhou (died 441 BC), king of the Eastern Zhou dynasty
Shi Xie (137–226), honoured as King Si in Vietnam